The Roewe Jing is a concept compact crossover fastback to be produced by SAIC Motor under the Roewe brand. The vehicle was unveiled at Auto Shanghai in China in April 2021 as a concept car.

Overview

The name “Jing” is Chinese for whale, with the front fascia filled with a pattern vaguely resembling the filter-feeding system found inside the mouths of baleen whales that replaces the traditional grilles.

As of March 2021, news of the reveal of a fastback version of the Roewe RX5 Max for the 2021 Auto Shanghai broke out, and that the vehicle would be built on the same platform as the Roewe RX5 Max. The powertrain is expected to be shared with the RX5 Max as well, including the 1.5 litre turbo inline four engine, and the 2.0 litre turbo inline four engine. Transmission options include a six speed manual gearbox, a six speed automatic gearbox, a six speed dual clutch transmission.

References

External links

Jing
Compact sport utility vehicles
Crossover sport utility vehicles
All-wheel-drive vehicles
Cars of China